Gare de Verneuil-sur-Avre is a railway station serving the town of Verneuil-sur-Avre, Eure, in northwestern France. The station is served by regional trains to Argentan, Paris and Granville.

References

Railway stations in Eure
Railway stations in France opened in 1866